Vieraella is an extinct genus of frog from the Lower Jurassic (Early Pliensbachian to Toarcian) Roca Blanca Formation of Argentina, and one of the oldest true frogs known. This genus is known by a single excepcionally well preserved specimen, P.V.L. 2188, with at least eight presacrals vertebrae, free ribs, ulna and radius not fused, bony skull with some discoglossid characters.

Description 
Despite living around 188 million years ago, Vieraella was anatomically very similar to modern frogs. For example, its hind legs were adapted for jumping, and the skull already possessed the lattice-like form found in modern species. It was, however, an unusually small frog, measuring only  in length. Although older frog-like creatures are known, such as Triadobatrachus, these possessed many primitive characteristics, and cannot be said to be "true" frogs.

References

Further reading 
 Estes, R., and O. A. Reig. 1973. The early fossil record of frogs: a review of the evidence. pp. 11–63 In J. L. Vial (Ed.), Evolutionary Biology of the Anurans: Contemporary Research on Major Problems. University of Missouri Press, Columbia.

Mesozoic frogs
Early Jurassic amphibians
Jurassic amphibians of South America
Early Jurassic animals of South America
Jurassic Argentina
Fossils of Argentina
Fossil taxa described in 1963
Transitional fossils